Ghulam Mohammed Mir was a former Indian militant. In 2010 he received the Padma Shri award, the fourth highest civilian award in the Republic of India for his public service works. As of 2010, Mir runs a bandsaw business in his native Magam in central Kashmir's Budgam district. He is there also known by his nickname Muma Kana.

References

Recipients of the Padma Shri in other fields
People from Jammu and Kashmir
People from Budgam district